Lesley Naa Norle Lokko  is a Ghanaian-Scottish architect, academic, and novelist. From 2019 to 2020 she was a professor and served as Dean of Bernard and Anne Spitzer School of Architecture City College of New York, in addition to juggling teaching positions and different careers in Johannesburg, London, Accra and Edinburgh.

In 2015, Lokko established the Graduate School of Architecture (GSA) at University of Johannesburg – an African school dedicated to postgraduate architecture education. She returned to Accra, Ghana, in 2021 and established the African Futures Institute, a postgraduate school of architecture and public events platform.

Early life and education
Lesley Lokko was born in Dundee, the daughter of a Ghanaian surgeon and a Scottish mother, and grew up in Ghana and Scotland. At the age of 17 she went to a private boarding school in England. She began studying Hebrew and Arabic at Oxford University, but left the programme to go to the United States. She graduated from the Bartlett School of Architecture, University College London, with a BSc(Arch) in 1992, and a MArch in 1995, and went on to earn a PhD in architecture from the University of London in 2007.<ref name=TheConversation>Lesley Lokko profile at The Conversation.</ref>

Career
Much of Lokko's writing contains themes about cultural and racial identity. She regularly lectures in South Africa, and has also taught in the United Kingdom and the United States. She also writes regularly for The Architectural Review. She is a contributor to the 2019 anthology New Daughters of Africa (edited by Margaret Busby). In 2004, she published her first novel, Sundowners, a Guardian top 40 bestseller, following up with eleven more novels. In 2020, she moved from Orion to PanMacmillan with her novel Soul Sisters.

Lokko has taught architecture all over the globe. Before exiting the United States, She was an assistant professor in Architecture at Iowa State University from 1997 to 1998 and at University of Illinois at Chicago from 1998 to 2000. In 2000, she became the Martin Luther King Visiting Professor of architecture at the University of Michigan. She then moved back to the United Kingdom for almost a decade, teaching architecture at Kingston University, University of North London and, finally, University of Westminster, where she established the current Master of Arts programme in the pathway of Architecture, Cultural Identity and Globalisation (MACIG).

Lokko was first appointed Visiting African Scholar at the University of Cape Town upon her return to South Africa. Tired of "Europe’s hand-me-downs", Lokko, in partnership with the University of Johannesburg, established the Graduate School of Architecture (GSA) in 2014/2015 and became the director of School. The GSA, modelled after the Graduate School of Design at Harvard University and London's Architectural Association, is the only school on the continent offering the Unit System way of teaching.

In 2015, Lokko became Head of the newly established Graduate School and associate professor of architecture at the University of Johannesburg."UJ’s Head of the Graduate School of Architecture, Prof Lesley Lokko, provides mentorship on Made in SA TV Show", University of Johannesburg, 2 August 2018. She founded the GSA at a time of political imperatives in South Africa and witnessed the large-scale student protests, with the uprising conscious of national identity in postcolonial South Africa.

In June 2019 she was named as dean of the Bernard and Anne Spitzer School of Architecture at the City College of New York, remaining in this position until 2020. She is currently founder and director of the African Futures Institute  in Accra, Ghana.

In 2021, she was appointed as the curator of the 18th Venice Biennale of Architecture, set to open in 2023.

Honours, awards and recognitions
Lokko was appointed Officer of the Order of the British Empire (OBE) in the 2023 New Year Honours for services to architecture and education.

2021 Ada Louise Huxtable Prize for Contribution to Architecture
2020 RIBA Annie Spink Award

Selected published works
2000: White Papers, Black Marks: Race, Culture, Architecture2004: Sundowners2005: Saffron Skies2008: Bitter Chocolate2009: Rich Girl, Poor Girl2010: One Secret Summer2011: A Private Affair2012: An Absolute Deception2014: Little White Lies2016: The Last Debutante2021: Soul SistersAs editor
2000: White Papers, Black Marks: Architecture, Race, Culture2017: FOLIO: Journal of Contemporary African Architecture2020: FOLIO: Journal of Contemporary African Architecture Vol 2 References

External links
 Lesley Lokko official website
 Lesley Lokko page at The Architectural Review Lisa Allen-Agostini, "Transforming Africa’s landscape", Trinidad and Tobago Newsday'', 11 June 2018.
https://www.architecture.com/knowledge-and-resources/knowledge-landing-page/professor-lesley-lokko-wins-2020-riba-annie-spink-award
Eleanor Young, "Lesley Lokko: Culture Revolutionary", https://www.ribaj.com/intelligence/lesley-lokko-profile-annie-spink-award-2020

21st-century Ghanaian women writers
21st-century Scottish novelists
21st-century Scottish women writers
Alumni of the University of Oxford
Alumni of University College London
Black British women academics
British women architects
Ghanaian novelists
Ghanaian women novelists
Ghanaian architects
Ghanaian curators
Scottish curators
Scottish women curators
Ghanaian women curators
Living people
Scottish architects
Scottish people of Ghanaian descent
Scottish women academics
Scottish women novelists
Academic staff of the University of Johannesburg
Writers from Dundee
Year of birth missing (living people)
Officers of the Order of the British Empire